Fabrice Yao Kan (born 29 December 1995) is a professional footballer who plays as an attacking midfielder and centre forward for Luxembourg National Division club Mondorf-les-Bains. Born in Ivory Coast, he plays for the Niger national team.

Honours 
Mondorf-les-Bains
 Luxembourg Cup runner-up: 2015–16

References 

1995 births
Living people
Footballers from Abidjan
Ivorian footballers
People with acquired Nigerien citizenship
Nigerien footballers
Ivorian people of Nigerien descent
Association football goalkeepers
Stade Tunisien players
Voltigeurs de Châteaubriant players
US Mondorf-les-Bains players
FC RM Hamm Benfica players
FC Swift Hesperange players
Luxembourg National Division players
Ivorian expatriate footballers
Nigerien expatriate footballers
Expatriate footballers in Tunisia
Expatriate footballers in France
Expatriate footballers in Luxembourg
Ivorian expatriate sportspeople in Tunisia
Ivorian expatriate sportspeople in France
Ivorian expatriate sportspeople in Luxembourg
Nigerien expatriate sportspeople in Luxembourg